Miguel Ángel López Jaén and Pere Riba were the defending champions, but López Jaén chose not to compete this year and Riba chose to compete at Wimbledon instead.Philipp Oswald and Martin Slanar won the final 6–2, 5–7, [10–6] against Sadik Kadir and Purav Raja.

Seeds

Main draw

Draw

References
 Main Draw

Camparini Gioielli Cup - Doubles
Camparini Gioielli Cup